"Stay" is a song by American group Jodeci from their debut album Forever My Lady (1991). The song was the third single released in promotion for the album in December 1991.  "Stay" was the group's second number one R&B hit, spending two weeks at number-one on the US R&B chart and peaked at number forty-one on the Billboard Hot 100. As this, it is also the opening track from Forever My Lady.

Track listing
12", Cassette, Maxi-Single, Vinyl
"Stay" (Radio Version) - 4:05
"Stay" (Instrumental) - 6:09
"Stay" (Album Version) - 5:11
"Stay" (Swing Bass) - 6:07
"Stay" (Swing Drums) - 6:09
"Stay" (Accapella) - 6:08

Personnel
Production: Al B. Sure!, DeVante Swing.
JoJo Hailey - Lead and Background vocals
K-Ci Hailey - Lead and Background vocals
DeVante Swing - Background vocals, Instruments 
Mr. Dalvin - Background vocals

Charts

Weekly charts

Year-end charts

See also
List of number-one R&B singles of 1992 (U.S.)

June's Diary version

"Stay" is a song performed by American recording R&B group June's Diary. It was released as the lead single on March 20, 2017, from their debut mixtape "Male Edition" (2017).

Critical reception
The song was met with positive responses from critics. Vibe magazine praised their version of the song stating "The Chasing Destiny stars take a trip back to the ’90s in their latest video for their spin on Jodeci’s “Stay.” Duly dressed for the ode to the iconic R&B group, Kelly Rowland’s protégées remind us why they earned their mentor’s stamp of approval as they nail the classic tune from Forever My Lady." Rap-Up gave their approval stating the group "put their soulful spin on another R&B group, Jodeci, and their classic Stay".

Music video
A music video was released to June's Diary's YouTube channel on March 16, 2017. A behind the scene's video of the music video was released a day later.

Formats and track listings
Digital download – Album
 "Stay" – 5:04

Release history

Notes

1991 singles
1991 songs
2017 singles
Jodeci songs
Uptown Records singles
MCA Records singles
Song recordings produced by DeVante Swing
Songs written by DeVante Swing